Oscar Rodriguez may refer to:

 Oscar Rodríguez Naranjo (1907–2006), Colombian painter
 Óscar Rodríguez Maradiaga (born 1942), Honduran prelate of the Roman Catholic Church
 Oscar Samson Rodriguez (born 1945), mayor of San Fernando City, Pampanga, Philippines
 Óscar Rodríguez Cabrera (born 1964), Mexican politician
 Óscar Rodríguez (cyclist) (born 1995), Spanish cyclist
 Óscar Rodríguez (footballer, born 1980), Spanish footballer
 Óscar Rodríguez (footballer, born 1995), Salvadorian footballer
 Óscar Rodríguez (footballer, born 1998), Spanish footballer
 Oscar Rodriguez (American football), American football coach
 Oscar Rodríguez (baseball), Cuban baseball player and manager